Joseph Christopher Hasham (OAM) (born 4 September 1948 Tripoli, Lebanon) is a Lebanese Australian actor and artistic theatre director who became famous in Australia in the 1970s through his long running role of dependable and decent gay lawyer Don Finlayson in soap opera Number 96.

Early life and education 

Hasham graduated from the National Institute of Dramatic Art in 1968 and subsequently  made several appearances in television series produced by Crawford Productions.

Number 96 

When Number 96 began in 1972, it was an instant hit. Original cast member Hasham became one of the most popular cast members, regarded as a sex symbol by many fans. He reprised the role in the feature film version of the serial, in which his character engaged in a gay kiss with the closeted Simon Carr (John Orcsik), although the shot was later cut from the film. Hasham continued to play the role until Number 96 ended in 1977.

Other work 

During the run of the series Hasham released a pop-music album, although he was not able to successfully launch a career as a singer. Later in the show's run a spin-off series focusing on Hasham's character switching to a career as a private investigator also failed to pan-out. After Number 96 ended Hasham continued his career with acting roles where he was part of a television series ensemble. His most widely seen post-Number 96 acting performance in Australia was likely an ongoing role as villain, Ken Hansen, in soap opera The Young Doctors in 1979. Through the early 1980s he presented a series of television advertisements for a television rental company called Electronic Sales and Rentals.

Emigration to Malaysia 

He emigrated to Malaysia in 1984. 
Initially, he joined with kindred spirits to form a commercial production company, which grew rapidly… finishing their material in Australia became a burden, and it soon became obvious there was a market for a local ‘post’ production facility.
Launched as GHA Images Sdn Bhd (Goudie, Hasham & Aman) in partnership with Antah Holdings, late in 1987. Subsequently it was rebranded, and still operates today as APV (Asia-Pacific Videolab).
Over the following decades of growth, APV has developed a reputation as one of the leading video post facilities in the region.
From that ‘foot in the door’ - into the Malaysian television and creative world, together with his actor wife Faridah Merican, he looked back to his roots and set up The Actors Studio actor training and theatre company in 1989. He is currently the Artistic Director of the company.

He and Merican are also responsible for the Kuala Lumpur Performing Arts Centre (KLPac) along with Living Arts Malaysia which aims to introduce theatre to young Malaysians. Hasham's production company JHA Productions is responsible for many of the commercials screened on Malaysian television.

Order of Australia 

In 2009, Hasham was awarded a Medal of the Order of Australia (OAM) "for service to performing arts through The Actors Studio, Malaysia, and as an actor, writer, producer and director".

Discography

Studio albums

Singles

References

External links 
 The Actors Studio
about Joe Hasham
 The Kuala Lumpur Performing Arts Centre
 Living Arts Malaysia

1948 births
Lebanese emigrants to Australia
Australian male television actors
Recipients of the Medal of the Order of Australia
Living people
20th-century Australian male actors